The Men's team sprint at the 2013 UEC European Track Championships was held on 18 October 2013. 12 nations participated.

Results

Qualifying
The fastest two teams progressed to the gold medal final; the following two progressed to the bronze medal final.

Finals
Final rankings were determined in the medal races.

References

Men's team sprint
European Track Championships – Men's team sprint